"The Fifth Step" is a short story by Stephen King, first published in the March 2020 issue of Harper's Magazine.

Plot summary

Harold Jamieson is a 68-year old widower and retiree living in New York City. While reading the New York Times on a bench in Central Park one morning, he is approached by "Jack", an alcoholic salesman who is attempting to complete Alcoholics Anonymous' twelve-step program. Jack has reached step five - "admitted to God, to ourselves, and to another human being the exact nature of our wrongs" - and at the behest of his sponsor has approached Jamieson, a stranger, to ask him to listen to his admissions. 

After Jamieson agrees to listen, Jack lists his various wrongdoings, which include fighting with another student in fourth grade for no reason, stealing alcohol from his mother, buying alcohol for a homeless man, cheating at Brown University, smuggling cocaine over the Canadian border, lying to his employer, and lying to his wife. Jamieson becomes uneasy after Jack describes having wanted to beat his wife after she argues with him about his drinking. 

As Jack prepares to leave, he confesses to Jamieson that he murdered his wife, then stabs Jamieson between the ribs with an ice pick. As Jack leaves Jamieson - seemingly dying - on the bench, he admits that he enjoys killing people, describing it as "the chief of my wrongs".

Publication
"The Fifth Step" was originally published in the March 2020 issue of Harper's Magazine.

Reception
The website EverythingStephenKing.com described "The Fifth Step" as "a nice story, well told" - noting "King's ability to create believable characters and situations has not diminished over the years" - but also as "forgettable" with a predictable ending.

References

See also
 Stephen King short fiction bibliography

External links
 "The Fifth Step"  at StephenKing.com
 "The Fifth Step" at Harpers.org

2020 short stories
Horror short stories
Short stories about alcoholism
Short stories by Stephen King
Short stories set in New York City
Works originally published in Harper's Magazine